Cuphea elegans is a species of flowering plants native to Brazil.

The species is recognized by Tropicos whereas The Plant List considers it a synonym of Cuphea melvilla Lindl.

References

External links

 Cuphea elegans at Tropicos
 Cuphea elegans at The Plant List

elegans
Plants described in 1877
Flora of Brazil